Protocol to the 1979 Convention on Long-Range Transboundary Air Pollution Concerning the Control of Emissions of Nitrogen Oxides or Their Transboundary Fluxes, opened for signature on 31 October 1988 and entered into force on 14 February 1991, was to provide for the control or reduction of nitrogen oxides and their transboundary fluxes. It was concluded in Sofia, Bulgaria.

Parties (as of February 2020): (36) Albania, Austria, Belarus, Belgium, Bulgaria, Canada, Croatia, Cyprus, Czech Republic, Denmark, Estonia, European Union, Finland, France, Germany, Greece, Hungary, Ireland, Italy, Liechtenstein, Lithuania, Luxembourg, Netherlands, North Macedonia, Norway, Poland, Russia, Slovakia, Slovenia, Spain, Sweden, Switzerland, Ukraine, United Kingdom, United States.

See also
 Convention on Long-Range Transboundary Air Pollution
 Environmental agreements

References

External links
Text.
Ratifications.

Environmental treaties
Treaties concluded in 1988
Treaties entered into force in 1991
1991 in the environment
1988 in Bulgaria
Nitrogen compounds
Air pollution
Treaties of Albania
Treaties of Austria
Treaties of the Byelorussian Soviet Socialist Republic
Treaties of Belgium
Treaties of the People's Republic of Bulgaria
Treaties of Canada
Treaties of Croatia
Treaties of Cyprus
Treaties of Czechoslovakia
Treaties of the Czech Republic
Treaties of Denmark
Treaties of Estonia
Treaties entered into by the European Union
Treaties of Finland
Treaties of France
Treaties of Germany
Treaties of Greece
Treaties of Hungary
Treaties of Ireland
Treaties of Italy
Treaties of Liechtenstein
Treaties of Lithuania
Treaties of Luxembourg
Treaties of North Macedonia
Treaties of the Netherlands
Treaties of Norway
Treaties of Poland
Treaties of the Soviet Union
Treaties of Slovakia
Treaties of Slovenia
Treaties of Spain
Treaties of Sweden
Treaties of Switzerland
Treaties of the Ukrainian Soviet Socialist Republic
Treaties of the United Kingdom
Treaties of the United States
Convention on Long-Range Transboundary Air Pollution
NOx control
Treaties extended to Guernsey
Treaties extended to the Isle of Man
Treaties extended to Jersey
Treaties extended to Gibraltar
Treaties extended to Akrotiri and Dhekelia
United Nations Economic Commission for Europe treaties